Charles Magauran, the Third, (Gaelic- Cathal Mág Samhradháin) was chief of the McGovern Clan and Baron or Lord of Tullyhaw barony, County Cavan including the period 1641 to 1657.

Ancestry

His ancestry was Charles son of Brian Magauran son of Feidhlimidh Mág Samhradháin (d. 1622) son of Brian son of Tomás (d. 1532) son of Maghnus (d. 1497) son of Tomás Óg (d. 1494) son of Tomás na Feasoige (d. 1458) son of Fearghal (d. 1393) son of Tomás (d. 1343) son of Brian ‘Breaghach’ Mág Samhradháin (d. 1298). His father Brian Magauran was his predecessor as chief of the clan. Cathal was the eldest son and his younger brothers were Domhnall (anglicised Daniel) Magauran and Feidhlimidh (anglicised Phelim) Magauran.

Chieftainship

On the death of the McGovern chief, his father Brian Magauran, some time after 1628, Charles took the chieftaincy and lived in Ballymagauran Castle.

1641 Rebellion

Charles joined the Irish Rebellion of 1641 against British rule and he led the McGovern forces in the wars that followed.

The surviving British settlers later made depositions about the rebels’ activities, some of which mentioned Charles and the other McGoverns.

County Cavan depositions

William Reynolds of Lisnaore made a deposition about the rebellion in Lissanover as follows:

George Butterwick of Drumlane parish stated:

Thomas Hedges of Cavan Town stated:

Martin Kilhare of Drumlane made depositions about the rebellion in Munlough South and Drumlane:

Dorothy Ward of Drumlane stated:

Arthur Culme of Cloughoughter Castle stated, inter alia:

Robert Simmons of Killeshandra stated:

James Gardiner of Aghabane stated:

Audrey Carrington of Ballyness, Bofealan townland stated:

County Leitrim depositions

Ralph Carr of Oughteragh parish stated:

The aforesaid Ralph Carr made a further statement:

Thomas Lewis of Oughteragh parish stated:

Nicholas Ward of Ballinamore stated:

George Bowker of Ballinamore stated:

Edward Bisphum of Drumreilly stated:

Elizabeth Kiddier of County Leitrim stated:

Mary Carr of Oughteragh stated:

Peter Lewis of Ballinamore stated:

Sergeant Scott of the garrison in Manorhamilton Castle published a diary in 1645. One entry states:

County Fermanagh depositions

Thomas Leysance of Mackan stated:

Siege of Croaghan and Keilagh

The castles of Croaghan and Keelagh, Killeshandra belonging to Sir James Craig and Sir Francis Hamilton were besieged by the McGoverns and O'Reillys when the 1641 rebellion started. The inhabitants held out until 15 June 1642 when they surrendered and went to Drogheda. However they occasionally made forays for food during the siege and one of them on 22 April 1642 was made in Tullyhaw when several McGoverns were killed. Dr. Henry Jones relates the incident:

Eleanor Reynolds of Lissanover also made a deposition about the siege of Croaghan as follows:

John Simpson of Killeshandra also made a deposition about the siege of Keelagh:

When Croaghan and Keelagh surrendered, Charles Magauran was one of the signatories to the surrender agreement:

Battle of Benburb

At the Battle of Benburb on 5 June 1646, the McGoverns fought beside Owen Roe O'Neill, probably under the leadership of Charles Magauran. His great-great grandson Major Edward Magauran refers to this event in his autobiography wherein he states- "I was born in 1746 at the residence of the M'Gauran family, called from them Balli M’Gauran. It is a market town of some note, wherein four considerable fairs are annually held. During their prosperous days, a stately castle reared its head, adjoining to the town, and was the abode of the Barons, but it was dismantled by order of Oliver Cromwell, and now lies in ruins. My great grandfather having thus involved himself in O'Neil's rebellion, and thereby forfeited his estates, they remained in the Crown till the reign of King James the Second".

Cromwellian confiscations

In 1657 A list of the Papist Proprietors names in the County of Cavan, as they are returned in the Civill Surveys of the said County gave the names of 20 landowners whose property was confiscated in the barony of Tullyhaw. These were Cormock MacBryan MacGowran; Bryan Oge MacGowran; Thomas MacGowran; Ffarrell MacHugh MacMarcus Oge MacGowran; Bryan Oge MacGowran; Daniell MacGowran; Philemy Oge MacGowran; Gilderneve MacGowran; Charles MacGowran; Nicholas O'Gowean; William MacGreame, gent.; William Gryme; Daniell MacGourke; Philip Mac Mullmore O'Rely; Charles O'Rely; Shane Reagh O'Rely; Hugh O'Rely; Owny Sherridan; James Talbott, Esq.

References

Irish lords
17th-century deaths
People from County Cavan
17th-century Irish people